The Derby of eastern Andalusia also known as the Andalucía Oriental derby (the Derbi Andaluz, the Derbi Oriental) is the name of a running football club rivalry in the  region, Spain, between Málaga CF (previously CD Málaga) and Granada CF.

History
The first official match between these two clubs was at the Campo de Las Tablas, on December 10, 1933 during the 1933–34 season of the Tercera División, when Recreativo de Granada (Granada's former name) beat CD Malacitano (CD Málaga's former name) 3–1.

Although CD Málaga disbanded, both CD Málaga and Málaga CF are considered to be the same club. Málaga CF merged with the CD Málaga reserve team, Atlético Malagueño, competing as an independent team from the 1992–93 season of the Tercera División. The official statement from Málaga CF is that the club is still the same as CD Málaga.

List of matches in official competition

Head to head results

Updated to derby #88 played on February 27, 2023.

References

Football rivalries in Spain
Granada CF
Málaga CF
CD Málaga
Football in Andalusia
Recurring sporting events established in 1933